Sandeep Kumar Ambalavanan is an Indian racing driver and attorney by profession.

Sandeep has been racing from the age of 14, starting from karting and climbing the ladder into the formula and saloon car racing categories like Volkswagen India Polo R Cup, MRF F1600, JK Formula India, JK LGB F4, Formula Fissme, Formula Swift and Rotax Max Karting Championships. His win in the 2012 National Volkswagen Polo R Cup India Championship earned him a scholarship to race in the 2013 European Scirocco R Cup Championship. In 2020 he became the champion of JK Tyre LGB Formula 4 National Championship, held in Kari Motor Speedway (Chettipalayam), Coimbatore.

Racing record

National

International

References

Living people
1992 births
Motorsport people from Chennai
Indian racing drivers